Arbury Hills is an unincorporated community in Will County, Illinois, United States.

Demographics

Notes

Unincorporated communities in Will County, Illinois
Unincorporated communities in Illinois